Erich Johann Albert Raeder (24 April 1876 – 6 November 1960) was a naval leader in Germany who played a major role in the Naval history of World War II.   Raeder attained the highest possible naval rank—that of Großadmiral (Grand Admiral) – in 1939, becoming the first person to hold that rank since Henning von Holtzendorff. Raeder led the Kriegsmarine (German War Navy) for the first half of the war; he resigned in 1943 and was replaced by Karl Dönitz. He was sentenced to life in prison at the Nuremberg Trials, but was released early due to failing health. Raeder is also well known for dismissing Reinhard Heydrich from the Reichsmarine in April 1931 for "conduct unbecoming to an officer and a gentleman".

This article covers Raeder's activities during World War II.

Beginning of the war: Raeder's political-naval plan

When Britain and France declared war on Germany on 3 September 1939, Raeder was shocked and shattered by the outbreak of a general war that for the Kriegsmarine was at least five years too early. Raeder wrote in the Seekriegsleitung war diary on 3 September 1939: "Today the war against England and France, which the Führer had previously assured us we would not have to confront until 1944 and which he believed he could avoid up until the very last minute, began ...As far as the Kriegsmarine is concerned, it is obvious that it is not remotely ready for the titanic struggle against England. To be sure, the brief period of time that has elapsed since the Agreement of 1935 has witnessed the creation of a well-trained and well-conceived force of U-boats, of which approximately twenty-six are currently ready for Atlantic operations, but these boats are still far too few to exert a decisive influence upon the war. The surface forces, moreover, are so weak and so few in numbers vis-à-vis the British fleet that the only course open to them-presupposing their active employment-is to show that they know how to die gallantly and thereby to create the basis for an eventual rebirth in the future". Because the great fleet envisioned in Plan Z existed only in blue-prints or had just begun to be built, Raeder like Tirpitz before him in 1914 was forced to abandon his pre-war plans for a great naval battle in the North Sea, and instead embrace the guerre de course strategy he had previously opposed. The disparity in size between the Royal Navy and the Kriegsmarine meant the great Entscheidungsschlacht in the Mahan-Tirpitz mold that Raeder planned before the war could only end in the destruction of the German force. Raeder's strategy, which was a modified version of the "double pole strategy" he had devised before the war, called for the Panzerschiffe, auxiliary cruisers and submarines to attack British merchantmen all over the world to force the Royal Navy to divert its strength while at the same time the main surface ships would make frequent raids into the North Sea to gradually reduce the Royal Navy's strength. Raeder had great hopes for the auxiliary cruisers which he sent to the Pacific, Indian and South Atlantic oceans to tie down British warships all over the globe. To get around the problem of the lack of bases outside of Germany and the shortage of Dithmarschen-class ships, Raeder had the Foreign Office in late 1939 negotiate secret agreements with Japan, Spain and the Soviet Union allowing German ships and submarines to use the ports of those nations to resupply, refuel and rearm. Owing to the shortage of surface vessels, Raeder's strategy was very much a guerre de course strategy that he reluctantly followed because the U-boats were the only offensive weapons at his disposal.

Raeder's strategy was much as political as naval. Having spent the last six years championing to Hitler sea power as the only way in which Germany could become a world power, Raeder was anxious that the Kriegsmarine be seen as doing more than its share of the fighting to ensure that Hitler would reward the Navy by not cutting its budget after the war. Raeder was obsessed with the fear that "the war would end before the heavy units had been engaged" and that the sailors would "fail" in their duty to the fatherland "due to inactivity", the last a veiled reference to the mutiny of 1918. In a message sent to all officers in June 1940, Raeder exclaimed: "The great aim of the Führer has set forth for the German nation requires the utmost exertion in all places ... A navy which undertakes daring actions against the enemy and suffers losses through this will be reborn on an even larger scale. If it has not fought this action, then its existence will be threatened after the war". As part of the "double pole strategy", mines were laid off the coast of Britain while submarines and merchant raiders were sent out to the Atlantic. In the first days of the war, submarines were ordered not to practice unrestricted submarine warfare as Hitler had hopes that Britain and France might make peace after the conquest of Poland, and feared that too many "incidents" at sea involving neutral shipping might bring the United States into the war as unrestricted submarine warfare had in 1917. In support of Hitler's diplomatic strategy, Raeder ordered the skipper of the submarine that sank  to falsify the log-book in order to support the German claim that the sinking of Athenia on 3 September 1939 was a British provocation intended to fool the United States into declaring war on Germany. A major factor that assisted the Kriegsmarines war against British commerence was that the B-Dienst as the German naval intelligence was known had broken many of the British codes before the war. In September 1939 to further concentrate power in his hands, Raeder created two Naval Group Commands, namely Naval Command West and Naval Command East that operated between the fleet commands and the naval headquarters in Berlin. The Canadian historian Holger Herwig argued that Raeder wanted a splinted command structure in order to increase his power, and that adding an extra layer of bureaucracy was unhelpful to efficiency. In the same way, Raeder always refused to appoint a flag officer with command experience to act as the liaison with the OKW out of the fear that such an officer might be a threat to his power. As much as possible, Raeder tried to avoid co-operation with the Army and the Air Force, and as such Germany never had a joint chiefs of staff or anything like it during the war to prepare a coordinated strategy.

Like Hitler, Raeder viewed Britain rather than France as the main opponent, and accordingly favored focusing on defeating the United Kingdom first. A major problem for the Kriegsmarine was like in World War I, it was difficult to attack the shipping in the Western Approaches to the British Isles from the North Sea, which was likewise difficult to break out from because of the British blockade. Raeder at first favored an offensive to defeat France in order to use the ports on the French Atlantic coast to attack shipping in the Western Approaches, only to be informed by General Franz Halder of the Army General Staff that the Army's current plans for a western offensive called for the Army to seize northern France and the Low Countries, which would be used as a basis for a final offensive to defeat France sometime in 1942; in the interim the areas seized would be used as the basis for launching air attacks on Britain. The Manstein Plan for a swift victory over France was not adopted until February 1940. Learning of the Army's western offensive plans in September 1939 led Raeder to turn his thoughts towards Norway. On a meeting on 10 October 1939, Raeder pressed Hitler for an invasion of Norway, unrestricted submarine warfare and to declare war on the United States if too many "incidents" involving the sinking of neutral ships led to American support of the Allies. The American historian Gerhard Weinberg wrote that Raeder was repeating "... the German navy leadership's argument of 1916 unaffected by the experience of 1917-18". Hitler gave his approval for unrestricted submarine warfare, but also stressed to Raeder that he did not want the United States in the war at this junction in time.

Reflecting his concern with the political aspects of his plan, namely to gain enough glory at sea to win post-war budget battles, Raeder was furious with the outcome of the Battle of the River Plate. Both Hitler and Raeder believed that Langsdorff should have fought the British and gone down fighting, even if it meant the deaths of most or all of the crew of Admiral Graf Spee. Raeder, knowing that Hitler was very displeased with the Navy as a result of the River Plate, issued orders that henceforth naval commanders were not to concern themselves with the lives of their crews, and were to go down fighting. Raeder's order of 22 December 1939, intended to avoid a repeat of the scuttling of Admiral Graf Spee, read:

"The German warship and her crew are to fight with their strength to the last shell, until they win or they go down with their flag flying. Once engaged, the battle is to be fought to the finish." After the Battle of the River Plate, the Flottenchef  Admiral Hermann Boehm was made the scapegoat for the scuttling of Admiral Graf Spee and was sacked by Raeder.

Raeder's deputy, Admiral Rolf Carls wrote with pride in his diary in October 1941 that "all our forces have been deployed so often and so recklessly that never can the charge of tepidity be levelled against us". Admiral Wilhelm Marschall after the war was to call Raeder's strategy as "wishful and prestige thinking, fateful overestimation of Germany's political and military possibilities, unfounded underestimation of the enemy England, and nonsensical insistence upon operational thoughts tied to the Z Plan", a naval strategy based upon "phantasy, prestige-seeking and playing vabanque".

Operation Weserübung: the invasion of Scandinavia

Raeder was promoted to Großadmiral (Grand Admiral) in 1939, the first to hold that rank since Alfred von Tirpitz. In September 1939, Admiral Rolf Carls start sending Raeder memos about the need to seize Norway as the best way of breaking the British blockade. On 3 October 1939, Raeder at a meeting of the Naval War Staff decided to ask the Foreign Minister Joachim von Ribbentrop if it would possible to gain "bases in Norway under the combined pressure of Russia and Germany". In October 1939, Raeder started to strongly push for an invasion of Norway. Raeder was primarily interested in using Norway as a base to allow the Kriegsmarine to attack the North Atlantic sea-lanes to Britain. Raeder first raised the subject of invading Norway during a meeting with Hitler on 10 October 1939, during which he argued that naval bases in Norway would allow the Kriegsmarine to avoid the North Sea, and thus strangle Britain better. The desire to use Norway as a base for naval attacks on Britain was the primary reason that motivated Raeder to advocate attacking Norway, and only in early 1940 did Raeder first mention protecting the sea lanes that allowed Swedish iron ore to reach Germany as a secondary reason for occupying Norway. During the same meeting on 10 October 1939, Raeder stated his belief that the more ruthless the war at sea, the sooner victory would come. The American historian Gerhard Weinberg wrote about Raeder's role in invading Norway that:"Inside the German government during the war, Raeder always called attention to his own role in pushing the invasion of Norway; after the war, he invariably blamed it on the British." Impressed by Raeder's arguments, Hitler ordered the naval general staff to start planning for an invasion of Norway in October 1939. During the planning stages in the winter of 1939–40, Raeder stressed that he did not want to see a temporary war-time occupation of Norway, but rather wanted to see Norway annexed to Germany. The two men who pushed most strongly for an invasion of Scandinavia in 1939-40 were Alfred Rosenberg, the N.S.D.A.P's "official philosopher" and Raeder, both of whom had difficulty at first in convincing Hitler of the value of such a move. The British historian Sir John Wheeler-Bennett wrote Weserübung was an "adventure that did not originate with Hitler. It was the brain-child of the joint genius of Grand-Admiral Raeder and Alfred Rosenberg" while William L. Shirer called Weserübung the work of "an ambitious admiral and a muddled Nazi party hack". In December 1939, Raeder befriended Vidkun Quisling, whose claims that most Norwegians were National Socialists and would welcome a German invasion he used to support the planned attack. Raeder had been introduced to Quisling by Rosenberg. On 11 December 1939, Raeder reported to Hitler that Quisling had told him during a meeting earlier that day: "... a British landing is planned in the vicinity of Stavanger and Christiansand is proposed as a possible British base. The present Norwegian government as well as the Parliament and the whole foreign policy are controlled by the well-known Jew, Hambro [ Carl Hambro, the leader of the Norwegian Conservatives and president of the Stortling], a great friend of Hore-Belisha ... The dangers to Germany arising from a British occupation were depicted in great detail ..." Quisling wanted to stage a coup d'état to establish a fascist regime in Norway headed by himself, and despite his claims that most Norwegians supported his Nasjonal Samling Party, claimed that his own people could not carry out the coup themselves without German military support. On 12 December 1939, Raeder told Hitler, Wilhelm Keitel and Alfred Jodl of the OKW that Quisling had made "a reliable impression" on him, and repeated Quisling's arguments of the previous day to explain why Norway needed to be invaded.

At the same time in early 1940 as plans for invading Norway were being discussed, Hitler had finally decided upon a plan for the invasion of France; the prospect of seizing bases in France, which were regarded as offering better access to the North Atlantic than Norway, caused many Naval Staff officers to abandon their support for Weserübung. On 13 January 1940, the Operations Division of the Kriegsmarine told Raeder that they did not believe that Britain was planning on seizing Norway, and any German move into Norway would be "... a dangerous undertaking" best avoided if possible. The American historians Williamson Murray and Alan Millet wrote about Raeder's thinking about Norway: "... since fall 1939, Admiral Raeder had advocated an aggressive policy toward Scandinavia to protect ore shipments and to establish naval bases in the area. However, Raeder was, as usual, not taking the long view. The western campaign, if successful, would provide Germany with the ore fields of north-eastern France, as well as a more favorable geographic position, without putting Germany's surface fleet at risk. Moreover, Raeder failed to take into account the possibility that in the long run Norway's occupation might represent a burden to Germany out of all proportion to its strategic advantages" For a short period of time in early January 1940, the German Naval Staff managed to convince Raeder that the "'best' solution was preservation of the status quo. In late January 1940, Hitler ordered planning to be resumed for an invasion of Norway. The Chief of the Army General Staff, General Franz Halder took the view that Weserübung was far too risky an operation, and excluded the Army from the planning of the operation. Halder believed that Weserübung would fail, and he did not want to associate himself with failure, preferring that Raeder take the entire blame when his "lunatic" plans to invade Scandinavia failed as Halder expected them to fail. Furthermore, Halder argued that Raeder had exaggerated the threat by posed by the Allies mining the Norwegian Leads, arguing that the ice on the Baltic would melt at the end of April, and that because of the Non-Aggression Pact of 1939 that Germany could always import iron from the Soviet Union to make up for any shortfall in Swedish iron imports. As a result of Halder's opposition to Weserübung, the operation was planned by the OKM and the OKW without no input from the OKH. On 1 March 1940, Hitler approved Operation Weserübung, the plan for the invasion of Norway and Denmark. Only on 2 March 1940 did Hermann Göring first learn of Weserübung, and expressed considerable fury about being excluded from the planning by Raeder, and that the Luftwaffe units assigned to the operation were to serve under the command of Army General Nikolaus von Falkenhorst. Because of Göring's objections to Weserübung, Hitler had to call a conference on 5 March 1940 to sort out the jurisdictional dispute, which ended with essentially reaffirming the operation with some minor concessions for Göring's bruised ego.

Norway was vital to Germany as a transport route for iron ore from Sweden, a supply that Britain was determined to stop. One adopted British plan was to go through Norway and occupy cities in Sweden. An Allied invasion was ordered on 12 March, and the Germans intercepted radio traffic setting 14 March as the deadline for preparation. Peace in Finland interrupted the Allied plans, but Hitler became convinced that the Allies would try again, and became more convinced of the value of Weserübung. On 13 March 1940 Jodl wrote in his diary that Hitler was "still looking for some justification" for Weserübung after it became clear that the Allies were not going to move into Scandinavia. At a meeting with Hitler on 26 March 1940, Raeder stated he still believed in Weserübung, and wished it to be started as soon as possible. Weinberg wrote that in late March-early April 1940 that "Raeder been especially insistent that the Germans invade Norway after it became certain that the British were not going to do so". At a conference on 2 April 1940 attended by Hitler, Raeder, Göring and Falkenhorst it was decided that Weserübung should begin at 5: 15 A.M on 9 April 1940. The new Allied plans were Wilfred and Plan R 4 for mining the Norwegian Leads to stop Swedish iron shipments from Narvik to Germany. The mines were laid on 8 April, by which time the German ships were advancing up the Norwegian coast.

The British historian Sir John Wheeler-Bennett wrote "Lunatic in conception, the Scandinavian expedition may have been from a rigidly military professional point of view, but it did not fail. It succeeded beyond even the hopes of its progenitors". Weserübung, though successful, proved to be a costly operation for the Kriegsmarine with almost the entire German surface fleet either sunk or badly damaged. At the end of Weserübung, the Kriegsmarine had only one heavy cruiser, two light cruisers and four destroyers available for operations. Since the victory over France provided the Kriegsmarine with the better placed French ports on the Atlantic and the iron fields of Lorraine, Weserübung proved to be unnecessary. Hitler told Raeder that he was impressed with how the Kriegsmarine had fought in Norway, and Raeder called it "the operation which will remain the feat of arms by the Kriegsmarine in this war". Raeder admitted in the Seekriegsleitung war diary that "The operation really breaks all the rules of naval warfare theory", which the Canadian historian Holger Herwig wrote strongly suggests that Raeder's real reason for Weserübung was his desire to win the Kriegsmarine glory in the war as part of an effort to compete with the army and air force for funding. In his report to Hitler about Weserübung, Raeder claimed that the success of the operation was "undoubtedly largely" the work of the capital ships, and argued that the campaign in Norway had "amply confirmed the soundness" (emphasis in the original) of the construction policies of the 1930s that favoured capital ships over U-boats and carriers. Admiral Wilhelm Marschall reported Raeder as saying during the campaign in Norway: "It doesn't matter if a battleship is lost. It is necessary that the battleship fight, even if it should be destroyed ... If there is no battle, it will be said that the battleships are useless and superfluous". The destruction of much of the Kriegsmarine surface forces in the Norwegian campaign forced Raeder to rely even more on the U-boats to wage a guerre de course against British shipping.

In late May 1940, Raeder ordered  and  into action off Norway's North Cape. Weinberg wrote about the North Cape raid: "There were, furthermore, increased by the extraordinary reaction of the German naval command to the signs of victory in the West as well as in Norway. The evidence suggests that Raeder completely lost his head over what he, like so many Germans, saw as the prospect of imminent victory in the whole war. Forgetting his and the navy's own prior emphasis on the French ports as the best base for Atlantic operations, and fearful that the war might end before he could demonstrate to Hitler's satisfaction the great value of a battleship navy, he ordered the two available battleships into operations off the Norwegian coasts in late May and June 1940. Both the Scharnhorst (only recently repaired from earlier damage in the Norwegian operation) and Gneisenau were torpedoed by British submarines in these prestige manoeuvres; they would not be ready for operations in the Atlantic again until the end of December. And in the process another German admiral was canned by Raeder, while his successor was covered with reproaches".  An even harsher assessment of Raeder's decision to send Scharnhorst and Gneisenau off the North Cape came from Murray and Millet, who wrote: "The Seekriegsleitung... had lost none of its ability to confuse strategy with bureaucratic interest. In late May, worried that German successes in France and Norway might bring the war to an end before his battle cruisers saw action, Raeder committed the battle cruisers Scharnhorst and Gneisenau to a raid off Norway's North Cape. The naval staff hoped to gain a success to influence postwar budget debates ... Since Raeder had already discussed with Hitler on 20 May the possibility of invading Britain, such a waste of German naval strength off the North Cape counts as one of the most egregious naval misjudgements of the war." Before sending Admiral Wilhelm Marschall out in Operation Juno, Raeder told him: "We must engage the enemy in battle, even if this should cost us one of the battleships. If they are not deployed, we will receive no more in the future". Marschall was enraged that Raeder sent him out on the North Cape raid without air cover or a screening force of U-boats, without informing him of what were the orders given to U-boats operating in the area, and with no plans for resupply. The period from April to June 1940 was one of the most stressful periods of the war for Raeder with operations involving the entire fleet in Norway, the French campaign and Raeder's obsessive fear that the Army and Air Force might win the war without the Navy, and which led to act in an manner that has been described as "irrational". Admiral Conrad Patzig commented about Raeder in early 1940: "Raeder is strongly influenced by his surroundings and exceptional circumstances and under stress is impulsive and unpredictable if his pride and vanity are involved". Raeders great fear was that after France was defeated, then Britain might sue for peace, in which case the Army and the Luftwaffe would have won the war without the Navy. During the North Cape raid, Scharnhorst and Gneisenau sank the British carrier  and two destroyers, but the damage that put those ships out of action for six months when they were needed for a possible invasion of Britain easily outweighed the loss of Glorious. After the North Cape raid, Raeder blamed Marschall for the damage that Scharnorst and Gneisenau had endured, claimed that Marschall had failed to understand his orders for Operation Juno properly, and sacked him. That Juno ended Marschall's career as Flottenchef suggests that Juno was seen as a failure in private, despite claims in public that it was victory.

"World Power Status": Raeder's dreams of empire

On 20 June 1940 Raeder sent a memo to Hitler calling for Germany to take over the entire French fleet and the French bases on the Atlantic coast and in Dakar. Hitler overruled him, arguing that such harsh terms were bound to be rejected by the French and that the French fleet would sail over to Britain to continue the struggle if confronted by such a demand; as a result of the armistice of 21 June 1940, the Kriegsmarine was only allowed to take over the French Navy's bases on the Atlantic coast. The use of the French Atlantic ports, especially Lorient, gave U-boats direct access to the Western approaches to the British Isles, and were a great advantage to the U-boats. Raeder was later to claim after the war the armistice as a great "lost opportunity" for the Kriegsmarine. Because it took several years to build warships, taking over the French fleet was Raeder's only hope of making good the Kriegsmarines heavy losses off Norway in 1940.

On 11 July 1940, Raeder met with Hitler where it was agreed that the work on the H-class "super-battleships" envisioned in Plan Z of January 1939 that had been stopped at the outbreak of war in September 1939 should resume at once. Since in early July 1940 it was believed by both Hitler and Raeder that Britain would soon surrender, the decision to resume the Z Plan, which meant spending hundreds of millions of Reichsmarks building warships that would take at least five years to finish, reflected plans for an ultimate war with the United States. Along the same lines, Raeder wanted major new bases for the Kriegsmarine at Trondheim, Saint-Nazaire, and Lorient and for bases at undetermined locations in the Canary Islands and in Morocco. The construction of the base at Trondheim was started and continued until March 1943. Hitler and Raeder planned not only to build a huge base at Trondheim called Nordstern which was intended to be the future home of the fleet envisioned in the Z Plan, but also to turn Trondheim into a German city of a quarter of a million people, which would be connected to Germany by a four-lane highway and gigantic bridges linking Scandinavia to the European mainland. In a series of reports Raeder submitted to Hitler written by himself and other senior officers starting in June 1940 called for Germany to turn France and South Africa into protectorates and to annex Norway, Denmark, the Netherlands, Belgium, Luxembourg and all of the British, French and Belgian colonies in sub-Saharan Africa in order that Germany would become the dominant naval power in both the Atlantic and Indian Oceans. The Reich Protectorate of Bohemia and Moravia was to be the model for the French and South African protectorates. In addition, Raeder and other senior officers submitted memos calling for Germany to annex Shetland, Iceland, the Channel Islands, the Faeroe Islands, Greenland, the Azores, the Canary Islands, São Tomé and Príncipe, the Cape Verde Islands, Saint Helena, Ascension Island, Iran, Fernando Po, the Cocos Islands, Aden, Socotra, the Comoros, Madagascar, the Mauritius, the Seychelles, North Borneo, Ceylon (modern Sri Lanka), Kuwait, the British mandates in the Near East, the Trucial States and, if at all possible, Egypt and the Dutch East Indies (modern Indonesia). However, Raeder and other admirals such as Rolf Carls and Otto Schniewind conceded the Dutch East Indies would probably have to go to Japan and Egypt to Italy in the interests of Axis solidarity. Iran, the British Persian Gulf protectorates and North Borneo were considered important as they were rich in oil, which was to power the Weltmachtflotte (World Power Fleet) envisioned in the Z Plan. Reflecting his belief that Germany would soon attain the long-desired "world power status", Raeder ordered the Naval General Staff in mid-1940 to start preparing for a war with Japan in the Far East. Raeder believed that once Britain was defeated, Germany would have to take on and destroy Japan to properly achieve its "world power status" because as a great sea power, Japan was bound to become an enemy of the Reich sooner or later.

Raeder's major fear in mid-1940 was that Hitler might not cripple Britain enough when the expected British surrender came, and instead make a "compromise peace" that would allow Britain to keep its "great sea power". Raeder believed that if Hitler should make such a mistake that a vengeful Britain would ally itself with the United States, who Raeder saw as a rival for "world mastery", then the English-speaking powers "will become the that opponent with whom we will have to reckon with in the near-future". At the same time, Raeder submitted a memo to Hitler complaining that Plan Z fleet was not large enough, and instead called for an expanded Plan Z fleet of 80 battleships, 15-20 carriers, 100 heavy cruisers, 115 light cruisers, 500 U-boats, and 250 destroyers. General Franz Halder after reading some of Raeder's memos wrote in his diary of "navalism run amuck" and commented about Raeder and other admirals that: "These people dream in continents". The German historian Michael Salewski called these world power plans of the naval leadership in 1940: "the colourful dreams of a prisoner in solitary confinement".

According to one view, Raeder's insistence that Germany either needed bases in or needed to annex the Canary Islands cost Germany the chance of bringing Spain into the war. In June 1940, the Spanish dictator General Francisco Franco decided to take advantage of the defeat of France and the widely expected defeat of Britain by entering the war on the Axis side. The Germans made it clear that if Spain entered the war, Franco would have to promise at a minimum, extraterritorial naval bases in Morocco and the Canary Islands to the Reich in exchange for which the Germans would reward Spain with various British and French colonies in Africa; Franco rejected the German preconditions which he saw as interfering with Spanish sovereignty, and did not officially join the war. The importance of naval bases in the Canaries and Morocco to Germany is shown by the fact that the Germans passed up their best chance of bringing Spain into the war rather than give up their demands for bases in and off north-west Africa, which were intended to support the Kriegsmarine in a future war with the United States.

Raeder's self-proclaimed status as the "father" of Operation Weserübung meant he took a special interest in Norway. Raeder had wanted Hitler to appoint Admiral Hermann Boehm to rule Norway, and was disappointed when Hitler instead chose Josef Terboven to be the Reichkommissar for Norway in April 1940. Despite that setback, Raeder backed Boehm's efforts to give the Kriegsmarine as great as role in running Norway as possible. Raeder, Boehm and Terboven all shared the same goal as incorporating Norway into Germany, but Boehm backed by Raeder often clashed with Terboven over the correct way of ruling Norway. Raeder and Boehm believed that Terboven was too brutal, callous and tactless and that if only a more gentle policy towards the Norwegians was followed, then the Norwegians could be won over to be willingly incorporated into a greater German Reich. Raeder did not share Quisling's goal of a fascist Norway ruled by himself as a German ally who was to be the equal of the Reich, but chose to back Quisling in his battles against Terboven as the best way of winning the Norwegians over to the "New Order". Raeder called his friend Quisling "a very upright, trustworthy man, typical of the somewhat dour Norwegian, but intelligent", whose only flaw was his substandard German. Raeder believed that for the duration of the war giving Quisling as much power as possible was the best way to persuade Norwegians to accept the "New Order", which in time would lead them to accept that their fate was to become part of Germany. Raeder was to find that Terboven had utterly no interest in sharing power with Quisling or anyone else.

Sea Lion and the "Mediterranean plan"

Raeder argued strongly against Operation Sea Lion, the planned German invasion of Great Britain, as Weserübung had almost destroyed the German surface fleet. He felt that the war at sea could be conducted far more successfully via an indirect strategic approach, by increasing the numbers of U-boats and small surface vessels in service to wage a Handelskrieg as guerre-de'-course is known in Germany against British shipping, which would have had the additional benefit from Raeder's viewpoint of bolstering his case for making the Kriegsmarine into the first service at the expense of the Army and Luftwaffe. By mid-1940, Raeder had come to appreciate that submarines were both cheaper and faster to build than warships. He also had doubts about Germany's ability to gain air superiority over the English Channel and the lack of regional German naval superiority. Air supremacy was a prerequisite to successfully preventing destruction of the German invasion fleet by the Royal Navy. The invasion of Britain was postponed indefinitely in September 1940 due to the Luftwaffe'''s failure to obtain air superiority during the Battle of Britain, and the significantly greater power of the Royal Navy over the German naval forces. On 21 July 1940, Raeder first learned that Hitler was contemplating invading the Soviet Union. At the time, Raeder had no objections to the proposed invasion other than to complain that it was likely to strengthen the budgets of the Army and Air Force at the expense of the Navy. The idea of a "peripheral strategy" for defeating Britain was first suggested in a memo to Raeder by Admiral Gerhard Wagner on 29 August 1940 when it was stated that Germany could not defeat Britain in the air nor sea, and instead just seek victory in the Mediterranean as a weak spot of the British Empire.

In September 1940, Raeder first presented his "Mediterranean plan" to Hitler. Raeder favoured a strategic focus on the Mediterranean theatre, including a strong German presence in North Africa, plus an invasion of Malta and the Middle East by German, Italian, Spanish and, if necessary, Vichy French forces. Raeder believed that capturing Gibraltar, and the Suez Canal would be a great blow to Britain. Afterwards, Axis forces would use the Canary Islands, the Azores and the Cape Verde islands to launch naval and air attacks that would destroy British commerce and knock Britain out of the war. On 6 September 1940 and again on 26 September, Raeder met with Hitler to advise the acceptance of his "Mediterranean plan". According to Raeder: "The British have always considered the Mediterranean the pivot of their world empire ... Germany, however, must wage war against Great Britain with all the means at her disposal and without delay before the United States is able to intervene effectively.Gibraltar must be taken. The Canary Islands must be secured by the Air Force.The Suez Canal must be taken.An advance from Suez through Palestine and Syria as far as Turkey is necessary. If we reach that point, Turkey will be in our power. The Russian problem will then appear in a different light ... It is doubtful whether an advance against Russia from the north will be necessary". On 30 May 1941 Raeder strongly advocated for a major offensive against Egypt with the goal of taking the Suez. He believed that if the Suez fell, it would deal a blow that "would be more deadly to the British Empire than the capture of London!" On several occasions, he suggested that Hitler send the vaunted tank commander Erwin Rommel to Egypt. Hitler agreed with Raeder's idea of sending German forces to North Africa at their meeting of 26 September 1940, but noted that he would need Italian permission to do so, and as it was not until Benito Mussolini requested German help in early 1941 that the necessary Italian permission was obtained. Murray and Millet wrote that Raeder's "Mediterranean strategy" had "... more to do with inter-service rivalry than with any strategic conception".

When Raeder first raised the "Mediterranean plan" on 6 September 1940, Hitler mentioned that he was also considering an attack on the Soviet Union, to which Raeder did not object, and only at the second meeting of 26 September 1940 did Raeder first argue for giving primacy to the "Mediterranean plan" over an invasion of Soviet Russia. Raeder's change of mind about what operation to give primacy to was mostly due to signs of increased American support for Britain such as the "destroyers-for-bases" deal of 2 September 1940, the Anglo-Free French attack on Dakar and the defection of several French colonies in Africa from Vichy to the Gaullists. Raeder argued that it was quite possible that the United States might intervene in the near future, which led him to argue that Britain must be defeated in the winter of 1940/41 before America could enter the war, while the signs that Vichy was losing its control over the French colonial empire meant the Allied cause was growing stronger in resource-rich Africa. Raeder argued that it was now time to sign a peace treaty that would make Vichy France into a full ally, claiming that Vichy French forces could take the important British naval base at Freetown and that, by ceasing to treat France as a conquered country, Germany would be allowed to gain all of the resources of the French empire and fleet.

A major historiographical debate concerns the question of whether Hitler tried to implement the "Mediterranean strategy" in late 1940. Globalist historians (who believe Hitler had a master plan for conquering the world) such as Andreas Hillgruber, Klaus Hildebrand and Gerhard Weinberg have argued that Hitler was never seriously interested in the "Mediterranean plan", that his main priority was always the invasion of the Soviet Union, for which he ordered planning to start in July 1940, and that Hitler's interest in the "Mediterranean strategy" in late 1940 was only half-hearted at best. Other historians, such as the German historian Wolfgang Michalka, the Anglo-German historian H.W Koch and the Israeli historian Martin van Creveld, have contended that Hitler's efforts to form an anti-British Eurasian "continental bloc" that was to include the Soviet Union in late 1940 as a diplomatic prelude to the "Mediterranean plan" were sincere, that until December 1940 Hitler's first priority was in defeating Britain, and that it was only when Hitler gave his approval to Operation Barbarossa that he finally lost interest in the "Mediterranean strategy". The British historian Aristotle Kallis wrote that the best evidence suggests that in late 1940 Hitler was serious about carrying out Raeder's "Mediterranean plan", but only within certain strict limits and conditions, and that he saw the "Mediterranean plan" as part of the preparations for Barbarossa by defeating Britain first. Kallis argued that diplomatic issues prevented Hitler from executing the "Mediterranean plan" in late 1940 as he wanted to. In June 1940, an agreement had assigned the Mediterranean as Italy's sphere of influence, and until Mussolini requested German help in January 1941, it was not possible to send German troops to North Africa. Operation Felix, the plan for taking Gibraltar, became stillborn as Spain remained neutral, a situation in large part caused by the German demand that Spain provide Germany with naval bases in Canary Islands as the price for Gibraltar. As proof that Hitler was serious about Raeder's "Mediterranean plan" in late 1940, Kallis noted that Hitler made a major push to bring Spain into the war between September–December 1940, and on 12 November 1940 ordered the Army General Staff to treat planning for Operation Felix as their first priority. Through Franco was keen to enter the war, the Spanish wanted major infusions of food aid to counter the anticipated effects of a British blockade, a German commitment to help modernize the Spanish military, and no German bases on their soil-conditions that Hitler refused to meet. After it became clear that Spain would not enter the war, on 18 December 1940 Hitler approved Operation Barbarossa, declaring that henceforth the Wehrmacht's number one priority would be the defeat of the Soviet Union "even before the conclusion of the war against England". The German historian Gerhard Schreiber wrote that Raeder's "Mediterranean plan" was a chimera because to carry out it would have required German diplomacy to make compromises with Vichy France, Spain and Italy that Hitler had no interest in making, and without the necessary diplomatic prelude the plan had no hope of ever being carried out. Along the same lines, the British historian Ian Kershaw wrote that Raeder's "Mediterranean plan" was impossible for two reasons. The first was that Hitler did not wish to treat Vichy France as an ally as Raeder had advised and that the only way in which he could have had the French fleet deployed against Britain was to stop treating Alsace-Lorraine like it had been annexed to Germany, a sacrifice that he was not prepared to make. Beyond that, Vichy France did not wish to give up its empire while Spain and Italy both desired to annex the same British and French possessions. Finally, many of the British and French possessions the Italians and Spanish both wanted were coveted by the Germans. The rival imperialist agendas of Vichy, Madrid, Rome and Berlin would have required a diplomatic "grandiose fraud" that Kershaw stated was beyond even Hitler. Finally, by the time that Mussolini finally requested German help after he had been driven out of Egypt and lost much of Libya in January 1941 Hitler had already decided upon Barbarossa, and the German forces sent to North Africa had the mission of only rescuing the Italians, not taking Egypt as Raeder had wanted.

Instead of the "Mediterranean strategy", the German war machine was diverted to Operation Barbarossa, the German invasion of the Soviet Union, which he vigorously opposed. Raeder thought Hitler was so fixated on wiping out the Soviet regime that he did not realise that a larger, global strategy could easily have tipped the balance in Germany's favour. Raeder always saw Britain as the main enemy, and argued that by destroying the British Empire would create the basis for a Weltreich (World Reich) that would take on the United States sometime later in the 1940s. Raeder shared Hitler's anti-communism through not to the same virulent degree, but saw the Soviet Union as an ally, albeit a difficult one that was and would continue to be of great assistance to the anti-British struggle; once Britain and the United States were defeated, then Germany should turn east against the Soviet Union. Kershaw wrote that there were two strands of German imperialism. One strand associated with Tirpitz, Raeder and others was focused on navalism, colonialism overseas and was very anti-British while another stand associated with the NSDAP and the Army was very anti-Slavic and focused on obtaining lebensraum in Eastern Europe. The two stands of maritime and Continental imperialism were not necessarily antagonistic, and could co-exist. Kershaw wrote that Hitler and Raeder had the same goals, but just differed about how best to achieve them. Hitler, in ordering Barbarossa, was not rejecting Raeder's "Mediterranean strategy", and was instead just postponing it. Hitler expected, and was told by all of his generals, that the Red Army was hopelessly inferior to the Wehrmacht, and that it would take the German Army at most six months, and more probably two to three months to destroy the Soviet Union.Weinberg A World at Arms pp. 187-189, 193-194 & 204-205. Once Barbarossa was completed with the destruction of the Soviet Union later in 1941, Raeder's "Mediterranean plan" would be executed in 1942 while German industry would focus on building the fleet envisioned in the Z Plan, that would, when complete, carry out Raeder's programme of trans-oceanic expansionism. Hitler was so confident of the success of Barbarossa that on 20 June 1941, two days before Barbarossa was to begin, he ordered that from 1 January 1942 the army was to go from first to third in regards to spending and allocation of raw materials to build up the Kriegsmarine and the Luftwaffe. The American historian Keith Bird summed up the strategic differences between Hitler and Raeder: "Raeder's continual pressure for an intensified war with Britain and his willingness to risk war with the United States, however, conflicted with Hitler's short-term continental goals. Raeder persistently tried to influence Hitler's every decision in favour of preparing the foundations for the next step of the Navy's ambitions. Above all, he wanted to ensure that the Navy would have a pre-eminent role in Hitler's Weltreich and armament priorities far beyond what it could hope to achieve in this war" Hitler saw the conquest of the Soviet Union, which was intended to give Germany lebensraum and with it control of enough of Eurasia, to provide sufficient autarky to challenge the sea powers and carry out Raeder's plans for trans-oceanic expansionism. Raeder by contrast preferred to focus on defeating Britain before turning east. Though Raeder often disagreed with Hitler on strategy, he was the beneficiary of huge bribes. In April 1941, Raeder accepted a 250,000-Reichsmark bribe from Hitler as a reward for loyalty to the Nazi regime. Another bribe Raeder accepted was a gift of a painting worth 38,000 Reichsmark. In general, officers who were in some way critical of Hitler's military, if not necessarily political leadership, such as Field Marshal Wilhelm Ritter von Leeb, Field Marshal Gerd von Rundstedt and Admiral Raeder, received (and accepted) larger bribes than officers who were well known to be convinced National Socialists, such as General Walter Model, Admiral Karl Dönitz and Field Marshal Ferdinand Schörner. The success of Hitler's bribery system backfired in that some officers, who had proven themselves especially greedy, such as Guderian and Raeder, came to be regarded by Hitler as a serious annoyance because of their endless demands for more money and more free land for their estates. Raeder's demand in 1942 that on top of his lifetime exemption from paying income taxes Hitler also cancel out taxes on the interest he earned from his 4,000-Reichsmarks-a-month payment from Konto 5 was viewed as outrageous greed.

1941: Going to war with America

In January 1941, Raeder launched the successful Operation Berlin, where Gneisenau and Scharnhorst were sent out on a raid into the North Atlantic that lasted until March 1941. On 4 February 1941, Raeder sent Hitler a memo suggesting that the continual neutrality of the United States was not in the best interests of the Reich, and suggested that having the United States as an enemy might even be "advantageous for the German war effort" if that would bring in Japan into the war against Britain and the United States. Hitler rejected that advice, saying that it was better at present to keep the U.S. neutral, since as long as the Americans were neutral, they were limited in how far they could support the British. On 18 March 1941, Raeder asked Hitler to end the rules that U-boats could not fire on American warships unless fired upon first, and instead demanded a policy that would allow the Kriegsmarine to sink all American warships on sight. Raeder also warned Hitler that Germany needed to take over the French colonies in West Africa, and warned that it would "most dangerous" if the United States should gain influence in French Africa. Hitler said he needed more time to think about what Raeder had suggested.

During the same meeting on 18 March 1941, Raeder said he wanted Japan to enter the war as soon as possible, stating that a Japanese attack on the British base at Singapore would force the Royal Navy to deploy most of its strength to the Far East, and thereby allow the Kriegsmarine to win the Battle of the Atlantic. Raeder further added that now was the best time for Japan to enter the war because with "the whole English fleet contained, the unpreparedness of the USA for war with Japan and the inferiority of the U.S. fleet compared to the Japanese". Raeder added that the fall of Singapore would "solve all the other Asiatic questions regarding the USA and England". The only problem with bringing about this scenario Raeder mentioned was that the Japanese had informed him that they would attack Singapore only "if Germany proceeds to land in England". The British historian Ian Kershaw described Raeder as having "trigger-happy" attitude to the United States in 1941, always pressing Hitler to take the most extreme measures with the Americans, whom Raeder hated almost as much as he detested the British. On 22 May 1941, Hitler asked if it was possible if the Kriegsmarine could take the Azores, which Hitler wanted to use as a base for launching long-distance bombers that would destroy the cities of the eastern United States. Raeder was forced to report with regret that Kriegsmarine "must reject the idea of occupying the Azores" under the account of the heavy losses endured in Westeruebung the previous year meant that the ships needed to undertake that operation were not there.

In April 1941, Raeder planned to follow up the success of Operation Berlin with Operation Rheinübung, where Gneisenau,  and  would be sent out on an extended raid into the North Atlantic under the command of Admiral Günther Lütjens. On the night of 10/11 April 1941 Gneisenau was badly damaged by a British bombing attack that put her out of commission for months. At that point, Admiral Lütjens advised cancelling the operation as having one battleship with only one heavy cruiser in support operating alone in the Atlantic was too risky, but was overruled by Raeder, who insisted on going ahead. Raeder's principal reason for going ahead with Rheinübung was his knowledge of the upcoming Operation Barbarossa, where the Kriegsmarine could only play a very small part, and his desire to score a major success before Barbarossa that might impress upon Hitler the need not to cut the budget for capital ships. Lütjens wanted Rheinübung put off until Scharnhorst was finished refitting in July 1941, but since Barbarossa was due to start on 22 June 1941, Raeder insisted that the operation go ahead in May 1941. Though Rheinübung saw Bismarck sink the battlecruiser , it ended with the sinking of Bismarck.

The loss of a modern battleship more than outweighed the loss of an old battlecruiser, and that debacle almost put an end to Raeder's strategy of using capital ships to destroy the British Merchant Marine. Murray and Millet wrote that after the loss of Bismarck that "Raeder's strategy of surface raiders had largely failed". After Bismarck was disabled by a British torpedo hit on the rudder on 26 May 1941, Raeder sent a series of radio messages to Lütjens reminding him of his "fight to the last round" order of December 1939, an order that Lütjens faithfully obeyed. The German historian Werner Rahn argued in Germany and the Second World War, the official history of the Wehrmacht that Raeder's orders to "fight to the finish" doomed most of the crew of the Bismarck to a watery grave; had Lütjens being given the option of scuttling or surrendering the Bismarck rather engaging in a hopeless battle, the lives of 2,200 German officers and sailors could have been saved instead of the 110 who were saved. Raeder himself was personally pleased by the sinking of Bismarck, feeling this had won the Kriegsmarine some much needed glory on the high seas and was consistent with his goal of "full engagement" where the Kriegsmarine capital ships were sent into action until they all were sunk to win his service glory, but Hitler was more than annoyed at the loss of Bismarck.

The deaths of most of the crew of Bismarck did not trouble Hitler, but he complained to Raeder that building Bismarck had cost millions of Reichsmark, and it seemed like a poor investment given that the ship was lost on its first voyage. Moreover, Hitler told Raeder that he believed that once the Soviet Union was defeated later in the summer of 1941, that it was quite possible that Britain would simply "collapse" as a result of that German triumph, and he wanted the German fleet to be ready to take advantage of the expected "collapse", not at the bottom of the Atlantic. After the loss of Bismarck, Hitler started to curtail Raeder's freedom to plan and launch operations on the high seas involving capital ships. Raeder's last attempt at using a capital ship as a raider occurred in June 1941, when he ordered the pocket battleship  into the North Atlantic; she was badly damaged by an attack from British torpedo planes on 13 June 1941 that put her out of commission for six months.

At this time, some naval officers expressed the concern that the British were reading at least some of the naval codes as the Royal Navy seemed to have a suspicious ability to know where German ships were, but Raeder dismissed these concerns. This was especially the case because in early 1941, the Royal Navy used intelligence from Ultra to sink all of the Dithmarschen ships and other supply ships that the Kriegsmarine used to supply U-boats and surface raiders on the high seas. The British had intended to leave two supply ships at sea to disguise the fact that they had broken the naval codes, but the remaining two supply ships were captured after chance encounters in the Atlantic. In response to protests from other senior officers that something was amiss as proven by the loss of the entire supply ship network in early 1941, in the middle of 1941 and again in the middle of 1942, Raeder ordered investigations into the security of German codes, but in both cases, it was concluded that the British were not reading German codes because the Enigma machine was considered to be unbreakable.

Despite Rheinübung and the damaging attack on Lützow, in July 1941 Raeder began planning for what he called "the battle of the Atlantic", a plan to send every single warship in the Kriegsmarine into the Atlantic to take on the Royal Navy in one colossal battle that almost certainly result in the destruction of the German force, but would hopefully make the British victory a Pyrrhic one. The planning for this operation only stopped in late 1941 when Hitler heard of it, and vetoed the operation under the grounds that even a British Pyrrhic victory was not worth losing every single German warship.

On 20 June 1941, Raeder used an incident where an U-boat had almost fired on an American battleship  the day before to argue that the Kriegsmarine should be given the right to fire on sight whenever American warships were encountered. Raeder told Hitler that "where the United States is concerned firm measures are always more effective than apparent yielding". Hitler gave Raeder strict orders for no "incidents" with the United States until the war with the Soviet Union was over. In July 1941, when the U.S Marines took over the occupation of Iceland, Raeder advised Hitler that Germany should declare war on the United States as a reply. On 9 July 1941, during a meeting with Hitler, Raeder said he had enough of the Americans, and after this latest act of American "aggression" as he called the occupation of Iceland, demanded that Germany declare war on the United States. Though Hitler rejected Raeder's advice, Raeder spent the entire second half of 1941 persistently pressing for Germany to go to war with the United States. Hitler was sympathetic to Raeder's anti-American fulminations, but said that the war with the Soviet Union would have to be finished before taking on the United States. In September 1941, Raeder and the U-boat commander Karl Dönitz presented Hitler with plans for an all-out U-boat offensive intended to destroy both the United States Navy and Merchant Marine. Raeder took the view that because of the increasing number of naval "incidents" in the second half of 1941 between U-boats and US ships guarding convoys to Britain, the best thing to do was to declare war on America in order to end all of the restrictions on fighting the U.S. Navy. Murray and Millet wrote that Raeder's views on the desirability of starting a war with the United States were "astonishing" because neither he nor anybody else in the Seekriegsleitung saw fit during July–December 1941 to commission studies on what would be the strategic consequences of war with the United States. On 17 September 1941, Raeder told Hitler that he believed that it was only American support that allowed Britain to continue the war and that the Kriegsmarine could defeat the United States Navy if only Hitler would just give the necessary shoot-on-sight orders. Once the Kriegsmarine had control over the Atlantic then Britain would collapse. Hitler replied that he wanted no "incidents" with the Americans, but he expected the war with the Soviet Union would be over by the end of September, and at the middle of October he would decide whatever to give permission to the Kriegsmarine to sink American warships-a step equivalent to declaring war on the United States.

Until the war with the Soviet Union was finished, Hitler was reluctant to have a war with the United States, and insisted upon avoiding "incidents" with the U.S. Navy as much as possible, whereas Raeder was all for a war with the United States. Hitler had cancelled the Z Plan again in late 1940, only to order it restarted in the middle of 1941 when it seemed that the war against the Soviet Union would soon be over and again cancelled the Z Plan in late 1941. When Hitler cancelled the Z Plan for the final time, Raeder forgot to cancel a contact he had placed with engineering firms for the engines of the first four of the planned H-class super battleships. As a result of that oversight, in June 1944 the Kriegsmarine had to accept and pay for four gigantic engines that were meant to power battleships that did not exist. From Hitler's viewpoint, it was better to wait until the Z Plan was complete before going to war with the United States. Raeder by contrast thought only of the "immediate operational advantages" that would accrue to Germany if the Reich went to war with the United States. On 11 December 1941, Germany declared war on the United States, which was at least in part due to the pressure of Raeder, who was very pleased with going to war with America. Even before the declaration of war on 11 December, Hitler had given orders to Raeder on 8 December 1941 that the Kriegsmarine could now sink on sight American warships and warships of all the Latin American republics except Argentina as well. Raeder gave orders that Kriegsmarine was now to begin Operation Drumbeat, the plan to defeat the United States by sending "wolf-packs" of submarines off the Atlantic coast of the United States to destroy all American shipping. On 12 December 1941, Raeder told Hitler that prospects for victory over the United States were good and that "The situation in the Atlantic will be eased by Japan's successful intervention". Continuing his analysis of the naval situation, Raeder told Hitler: "Reports have already been received of the transfer of some [American] battleships from the Atlantic to the Pacific. It is certain that light forces, especially destroyers will be required in increased numbers in the Pacific. The need for transport ships will be very great, so that a withdrawal of American merchant ships from the Atlantic can be expected. The strain on British merchant shipping will increase ... The U.S will have to concentrate all her strength in the Pacific during the next few months. It is hardly likely that transport tonnage is available for such occupation tasks or bringing up supplies ... It is improbable that the enemy will give up East Asia even temporarily; by so doing Britain will endanger India very seriously, and the U.S. cannot withdraw her fleet from the Pacific as long as the Japanese fleet has the upper hand". Much to Raeder's annoyance, Hitler followed up declaring war on the U.S. by sending 23 U-boats to the Mediterranean to attack British shipping and another 16 to Norway to guard against a phantom British invasion instead of focusing the U-boat fleet off the eastern United States. Because the United States Navy under the leadership of Admiral Ernest King was not ready for anti-submarine warfare, U-boat operations off the east coast of America in the first half of 1942 were very successful, and only the diversion of the U-boat fleet to the Mediterranean and Norway kept them from being more successful. The entry of the United States into the war meant the ultimate defeat of the Kriegsmarine as the tremendous productive capacity of American industry meant that the Allies could replace every ship sunk by the U-boats, and then build some more. In 1943, American shipyards turned out enough ships to almost equal the number of all the ships sunk by U-boats between 1939 and 1942. Murray and Millet accused Raeder and the rest of the Seekriegsleitung of wanting war with America because the United States was an "easy target" and of "taking the easiest tactical and operational path without the slightest thought to the strategic or long-range consequences".

1942: "The Great Plan"

In early 1942, Raeder become involved in a scandal when it was discovered that he had been a part of group of high-ranking officials who had abused their positions to buy more groceries than the rationing permitted, but Hitler ordered the matter to be covered up. The Propaganda Minister Joseph Goebbels wanted Raeder and the other high officials of the "grocery ring" like Wilhelm Keitel, Hermann Göring and Hans Lammers who had used their positions to ignore rationing when grocery shopping to be punished in order to let the German people know that the elite were suffering like everyone else, but Hitler claimed if the German people learned of the luxurious lifestyles of the elite in the middle of a war that the effect would be fatal to morale. The men of the "grocery ring" were only warned to be more discreet in the future when buying their groceries. Also in January 1942 that Raeder long-running battle with Terboven over whatever Quisling should be allowed to form a government in Norway ended with Raeder seemingly gaining the upper hand. Largely due to pressure from Quisling's friends Raeder, Boehm and Rosenberg that Hitler overruled Terboven and in January 1942 allowed Quisling to form a government in Oslo. Despite this apparent triumph, in practice Quisling had little power, and moreover proved himself manifestly out of his depth in attempting to run a government. Terboven continued to rule Norway while lashing out at the Navy's efforts to back Quisling.

In late 1941, Hitler ordered all of the capital ships of the Kriegsmarine to Norway because of his fears of a British invasion, and because after the sinking of the Bismarck, it was judged too risky to send out capital ships as raiders. Accordingly, Raeder planned the Channel Dash of February 1942 that saw Scharnhorst, Gneisenau and Prinz Eugen make the run from Brest to Wilhelmshaven, and on to Norway. The concentration of the German fleet in Norway served three purposes; namely as a threat to Anglo-American convoys carrying supplies around the North Cape to the Soviet Union, to deter an Allied invasion of Norway and as a fleet in being that tied down British warships at Scapa Flow that might otherwise be deployed in the Battle of the Atlantic. The role of a fleet in being contradicted the role of using the fleet in Norway against convoys making the Murmansk run. Attacking Arctic convoys meant the risk that the ships of the fleet might be sunk or damaged in the ensuring engagements, while the role of a fleet in being required the continual existence of these ships. Neither Raeder or Hitler could quite make up their minds about what was the primary purpose of the German fleet in Norway, which led to much command confusion, and in turn led ultimately to the defeat in the Battle of the Barents Sea.

In February 1942, Raeder presented Hitler with the "Great Plan", a grand strategic design for winning the war by a series of combined operations with Japan and Italy. Through essentially a rehash of the "Mediterranean plan" of 1940 with the main German blows to be focused against the British in the Middle East, the "Great Plan" of 1942 was worked out in considerably more detail, and called for a series of mutually supporting attacks between Germany in the Middle East and Japan in the Indian subcontinent that were intended to knock Britain out of the war. On the German side of things, Raeder called for Axis forces to take Malta and drive on across the North African desert to the Suez Canal. Once that had occurred, it would be possible for the German and Italian forces in the Mediterranean to link up with Japanese forces in the Indian Ocean via the Red Sea-a situation that Raeder claimed would not only cause the collapse of the British Empire, but create the preconditions for the defeat of the United States. Raeder called Erwin Rommel's Afrika Korps in effect "an organ of the Seekriegsleitung" because it would have the function of taking Egypt. Finally for Raeder's "Great Plan" required the Kriegsmarine to take over the French fleet at Toulon in order to create the necessary battlefleet that would allow the German navy to be equal partner of the Japanese and the Italians. Operation Drumbeat, the "Second Happy Time" of the U-boats had inflicted heavy losses on shipping off the Atlantic coast of the United States in early 1942, and which had followed up by another U-boat offensive in the Gulf of Mexico and the Caribbean starting in May 1942 and another one in Canadian waters in the summer of 1942. In May 1942, the Kriegsmarine sunk more tonnage in the Gulf of Mexico and the Caribbean than had been done during any of the months of the "First Happy Time" of 1940. Between January–August 1942 the U-boats had sunk 485 ships totalling 2, 600, 000 tons in the waters from Canada to the Caribbean, inflicting what the American historian Gerhard Weinberg called "... the most disastrous defeat ever suffered by American naval power". In addition, April 1942 saw the introduction of "milch cow" submarines that served to supply other U-boats, thus extending the cruise time of boats in the New World, and which had been ordered by Raeder in 1941 to make up for the destruction of the supply ship network by the Royal Navy in the spring of 1941. Operation Drumbeat seemed to confirm Raeder's repeated statements in 1941 that the United States was a paper tiger that the Kriegsmarine could easily defeat, and as a result Raeder's prestige with Hitler in early 1942 was quite high. Because the Kriegsmarine's operations in the New World were so successful, Hitler had some interest in Raeder's "Great Plan", but objections from General Franz Halder of the Army General Staff who accused Raeder of having no understanding of logistics together with the fact that the Army was fully engaged on the Eastern Front meant in the end Raeder's "Great Plan" was ignored.

As the U-boats continued to be the arm of the Kriegsmarine that was doing most of the fighting, by 1942 Raeder was becoming increasingly overshadowed by Admiral Karl Dönitz, who made little secret of his contempt for the "battleship admiral" Raeder, and started to act more and more independently, for instance, dealing directly with Albert Speer in settling construction targets for the U-boats. Dönitz had little respect for "old navy" admirals like Raeder, whom he accused of being more interested in a building a great fleet after the war than in actually winning the war. By early 1942, Raeder and Dönitz were openly feuding with each other, with Dönitz mocking Raeder's obsession with "dinosaurs", as Dönitz called battleships, and Raeder complaining of Dönitz's massive ego and his tendency to run the U-boat arm as it were his own private navy. Dönitz harboured enormous resentment against Raeder for starving the U-boat arm of funds before the war in order to concentrate on building battleships. Raeder and Dönitz constantly fought over what was the proper use of the U-boats, namely to win the "tonnage war" by sinking as much as tonnage as possible, as Dönitz wanted, or win the "commerce war" by denying the Allies use of certain waterways like the North Cape route to the Soviet Union as Raeder favoured. The dispute about the "tonnage war" versus the "commerce war" reflected the differing concepts of the guerre de course versus the teachings of Mahan. Dönitz, as a follower of the guerre de course theories of Théophile Aube, was interested in doing as much damage to the enemy merchant fleets as possible whereas Raeder, as a follower of Mahan. was concerned about seizing and maintaining control of key waterways.

In late 1942, in an attempt to limit Dönitz's power and cut down his "vanity", Raeder took away responsibility for training U-boat crews from Dönitz, only to see Dönitz ignore his orders. Dönitz informed Raeder that he was disregarding that order and he would continue to train crews for "my" U-boats as Dönitz rather possessively described the U-boat fleet. The authoritarian Raeder, who was not used to having his orders disobeyed, never forgave Dönitz. Raeder longed to sack Dönitz, but was unwilling to do so as he felt that was nobody to replace the aggressive and fanatically National Socialist Dönitz, who knew more about submarine warfare than any other admiral in the Kriegsmarine and seemed to be on the verge of winning the Battle of the Atlantic. Despite his strong dislike of Dönitz, Raeder recognized the success of the U-boats, and lobbied Hitler for more funding of submarine construction. Raeder appreciated that by 1942, the U-boats were the Navy's only means of playing a "decisive" role in the war, and of defeating the nation that Raeder saw as the real enemy, Britain. By 1942, Dönitz had emerged as Hitler's favourite admiral (whom Hitler liked so much that he eventually named him as his successor), and that to sack Dönitz would probably lead Hitler to sack him in turn. Recognizing Hitler's fondness for Dönitz, Raeder always took Dönitz with him (despite their mutual dislike) when he went to lobby Hitler for more naval funding, guessing correctly that Hitler was more likely to say yes to a request for more money for U-boat construction from Dönitz than he was from himself. Hitler was won over, and ordered German industry to make manufacturing submarines the second-highest priority, being only exceeded in importance by the need to manufacture weapons for the troops on the Eastern Front. On 28 September 1942, at a conference attended by Hitler, Raeder, Dönitz and Admiral Werner Fuchs (the man in charge of naval construction) the advantages of a new type of submarine, known as the Walter boat which go 20 knots underwater (three times than what current U-boats could manage) were reviewed. It was decided to build a small number of Walter boat submarines, but Dönitz successfully argued that it was better to increase production of the existing U-boat types rather switch over to using Walter boats. Only in 1943 did Dönitz change his mind about the Walter boat.

In December 1942, Raeder enforced the Commando Order by having captured British Royal Marines shot after the Operation Frankton raid on a German naval base in Bordeaux. In the Seekriegsleitung war diary, Raeder wrote that the executions of the Royal Marines were "an innovation in international law since the soldiers were wearing uniforms".Thomas p. 213. The American historian Keith Bird wrote that Raeder seemed "uncomfortable" with the Commando Order, but nonetheless enforced it. The American historian Charles Thomas wrote that Raeder's remarks about the executions in the Seekriegsleitung war diary could have been meant as some sort of ironic comment in protest against the executions, which might have reflected a guilty conscience on the part of Raeder in enforcing a policy that he knew well to be illegal, and one that might lead him to being prosecuted for war crimes if Germany should lose the war.

Building a National Socialist navy: terror and propaganda

A harsh disciplinarian, Raeder was obsessed with the fear that the Navy might "disgrace" itself as it did in the last war with High Seas mutiny of 1918, and to prevent another mutiny, Raeder imposed a "ruthless discipline" designed to terrorize his sailors into obedience. Under the leadership of Raeder and even more so under his successor Karl Dönitz, it was official policy for naval courts-martial to impose the death penalty as often as possible, no matter how slight the offence, so that the sailors would fear their officers more than the enemy. Historians have described Raeder as someone who "supported the Nazi regime unflinchingly and proved merciless against malingerers, deserters and those who questioned the authority of the Führer".

As a counterpart to his policy of terror, Raeder placed great emphasis on "spiritual leadership" as a war-winning factor in the Kriegsmarine, which in practice meant an intense program of National Socialist propaganda. Obsessed as always with the fear of another mutiny like that of 1918, Raeder believed that the correct "spiritual leadership" on the part of the officers would prevent such an occurrence. Officers were ordered to conduct indoctrination sessions with their sailors to remind them that they were fighting not just for Germany, but for National Socialism and Hitler as well. A large role was allocated to the so-called Sonderführer, reporters from the Propaganda Ministry who were commissioned into the Kriegsmarine as lieutenants or NCOs, and whose duties included not only reporting for the public, but also promoting National Socialist propaganda. Even more important were the Wehrbetreuungsoffizer that from 1940 on served in every vessel and with land units from the company level on up and whose job was to prevent a repeat of the High Seas Fleet mutiny of 1918 by morale-boosting and promoting National Socialist thinking. In November 1941, Raeder was to complain that the Kriegsmarine would fight better if only the sailors were more indoctrinated into National Socialism, and ordered his officers to do more to indoctrinate their men into National Socialism. In a speech in early January 1943, Raeder called World War II an ideological war, praised National Socialism for its "moral strength", and claimed that only through National Socialist indoctrination could the war be won. Raeder went on to call for indifference to National Socialism in the Kriegsmarine to be destroyed "root and branch" and stated: "We cannot win the war against a fanatical enemy with the old principle of 'live and let live'". Raeder finally ended his speech with the statement: "Do not think only of the present day or the present war; think instead of the millennia in which the German nation has already struggled and of the centuries that lie before us and require a wise use of all our resources from this day on ... Remember, therefore, the most important axiom in the thoughts of our Führer and Supreme Commander; it is not the individual, the family or the clan that count, but the Volk and Volk alone. That which serves it is good; that which harms it is bad. The Volk incorporates our highest goals. Its thousand-year tasks and struggles extend onto the heights from which divine providence directs all life." Given Raeder's religious feelings, in no other branch of the Wehrmacht did chaplains play such a prominent role as the Kriegsmarine. The Navy's chief chaplain was the Lutheran Pastor Friedrich Ronneberger, an ardent N.S.D.A.P member and a leading member of the "German Christian" movement. It was official policy of the Wehrmacht to favor the recruitment of German Christian pastors, and those pastors belonging to the Confessing Church were banned from becoming Wehrmacht chaplains. German Christian pastors serving as Wehrmacht chaplains preached a "manly Christianity" to Wehrmacht members that unabashedly glorified war as the only fit and proper activity for "real men".

One result of Raeder's efforts to indoctrinate the Kriegsmarine was to make a great many of his officers and men into Nazi fanatics. Royal Navy reports of captured Kriegsmarine officers and sailors often commented as one report from October 1940 noted the POWs "were all fanatical Nazis and hated the British intensely, which had not been so evident in previous cases". The Royal Navy went on to note that based on its interrogations of Kriegsmarine POWs that Raeder's indoctrination policy had borne fruit in that the morale of the Kriegsmarine was extremely high, with the majority of officers and sailors very proud to fight for Führer'' and fatherland.

References

Citations

External links
The Victory Strategy Raeder proposed to Hitler by Bevin Alexander

 3
Naval history of World War II